Rhian Dodds (born 3 October 1979) is Canadian footballer who played as a midfielder in the Canadian Soccer League, and the Scottish Premiership. He also holds British citizenship, but represented Canada internationally on the Under-20 level.

Playing career 
Born in Irvine, Scotland, Dodds grew up in Hamilton, Ontario, Canada. He attended Robert Morris University, playing for the Colonials before joining Kilmarnock. He was given the nickname "Dick Turpin" after scoring a late winner against Motherwell at Fir Park in season 2006–07 by the stadium announcer, insinuating that Kilmarnock had "stolen" the victory with virtually the last kick of the ball.

After a seven-year tenure in Scotland he returned to his hometown of Hamilton, and signed with Hamilton Croatia of the Canadian Soccer League. Where he was united with his younger brother Jamie Dodds. He made his debut for the club on 11 June 2010 in a match against Brantford Galaxy.

References

External links

1979 births
Living people
Canadian expatriate sportspeople in the United States
Canadian expatriate soccer players
Canadian soccer players
Expatriate soccer players in the United States
Association football midfielders
Kilmarnock F.C. players
Dundee F.C. players
Hamilton Croatia players
Naturalized citizens of Canada
Footballers from Irvine, North Ayrshire
Soccer players from Hamilton, Ontario
Robert Morris Colonials men's soccer players
Scottish footballers
Scottish emigrants to Canada
Scottish Premier League players
2005 CONCACAF Gold Cup players
Canadian Soccer League (1998–present) players
Canadian expatriate sportspeople in Scotland